Alexandre Constantinovich (or Konstantinovitsch)  Chnéour (he signed  Schneeur on some articles written in German) (August 30, 1884, Saint Petersburg - September 16, 1977, San Francisco)  was a entomologist and  herpetologist born in the Russian Empire.

As a young man, Chnéour had an early passion for butterflies. After travelling in Germany and in Switzerland, he studied at the Gurevich School of St. Petersbourg ans then at the Mihailovsky Artillery School. He left there with the rank of lieutenant and became an officer in a mobile unit artillery.

Decorated at the very start of the First World War, he joined the Russian Air Force in 1916 and started a short career in aviation. He supplemented his military training with studies at the Military Academy.

During the Soviet Revolution of 1917, Chnéour joined the  anticommunist White Army and served with the Armenian army in 1918-1919. He later joined the forces of General Anton Denikin. He was evacuated to the  Gallipoli camp in Turkey and went to Bulgaria where he gave courses in a military academy of engineering to members of the White Army. He settled in Lyon and then, in 1929, in Tunisia, where he worked as a cartographer.

Chnéour started writing on the butterflies of Tunisia in 1934 and published six articles in German under the name Schneeur between 1934 and 1937. Until 1956, he regularly published articles on the butterflies of Tunisia. With N Chpakowsky, he also published an article on the snakes of Tunisia.

Chnéour had to leave Tunisia at the time of its independence in 1956 and emigrated to the United States with his collection. He lived initially in New York where, with the American Museum of Natural History, he checked the identification of his Tunisian captures. He was then injured  by a fall in the library where he worked. Chnéour next settled in California and gave his collections to the California Academy of Sciences. At the age of 90 years he was wounded by a burglar and had to be hospitalized.

Sources 
 Paul H. Arnaud Jr (2001), Obituary: Alexandre Constantinovich Chnéour (Schneeur) (1887-1977). Myia, 6: 205-212. - the author quotes a complete bibliography of Chénour as well as the list of taxa which were dedicated to him.

External links
  pdf biography and publication list

Lepidopterists from the Russian Empire
Herpetologists from the Russian Empire
1884 births
1977 deaths
Scientists from Saint Petersburg
Air Force personnel of the Russian Empire
Scientists from New York City
World War I pilots from the Russian Empire
White Russian emigrants to France
French emigrants to Tunisia
Tunisian emigrants to the United States